Michael R. Hayden,  (born 1951) is a Killam Professor of Medical Genetics at the University of British Columbia, the highest honour UBC can confer on any faculty member. Only four such awards have ever been conferred in the Faculty of Medicine. Dr. Hayden is also Canada Research Chair in Human Genetics and Molecular Medicine. Hayden is best known for his research in Huntington disease (HD).

He is a senior scientist and former director of the Centre for Molecular Medicine and Therapeutics (CMMT) in Vancouver, British Columbia, Canada; a genetic research centre within UBC's Faculty of Medicine and affiliated with the BC Children's Hospital Research Institute and the BC Children's Hospital Foundation, which he founded. He was also the Program Director of the Translational Laboratory in Genetic Medicine in Singapore from 2011-2020, and was appointed as the President of Global R&D and Chief Scientific Officer at Teva Pharmaceutical Industries from 2012–2017. During this time, approximately 35 new products were approved in major markets with many for diseases of the central nervous system and led the approval of Austedo for chorea in HD, the second drug ever to be approved for HD. In 2015, Teva R&D was recognized as one of the 10 most exciting innovators in Pharma by IDEA Pharma and in 2017, Teva R&D ranked top of the industry for CNS development and clinical trial success by Pharma Intelligence.

Hayden is the most cited author in the world for Huntington disease and ABCA1, and has authored over 900 publications and invited submissions (Google Scholar citations 99,672, h-index 160, i10-index 766; Web of Science citations 65,327, h-index 123).

In 2007, he received the Prix Galien which recognizes the outstanding contribution of a researcher to Canadian pharmaceutical research; in 2008, recognition from the Canadian Institutes of Health Research (CIHR) as Canada's Health Researcher of the Year: CIHR Michael Smith Prizes in Health Research.  In 2010, he was awarded Member of the Order of Canada, following his receipt of the Order of British Columbia in 2009. Hayden received the Canada Gairdner Foundation Wightman Award  in 2011, recognizing him as a physician-scientist who has demonstrated outstanding leadership in medicine and medical science. He was inducted into the Canadian Medical Hall of Fame in 2017. Most recently in 2020, Hayden was awarded the David Dubinsky Humanitarian Award from the American Friends of Soroka Medical Center (AFSMC). In addition to his academic work, Hayden is the co-founder of five biotechnology companies including: Prilenia, NeuroVir Therapeutics Inc., Xenon Pharmaceuticals Inc., Aspreva Pharmaceuticals Corp and 89Bio and the CEO of Prilenia Therapeutics. He currently sits on different public and private boards of biotechnologies companies.

Biography 
Hayden was born in Cape Town, South Africa, one of Ann Platt's and Roger Hayden's two sons. His paternal grandfather, Max Raphael Hahn was an entrepreneur, art collector and chairman of the Jewish community in Göttingen, Germany. His father, originally named Rudolf (Rudi) Hahn, fled to London in 1939, enlisted in the British army and fought during World War II, and eventually settled in South Africa in 1947. After the divorce of his parents, when he was eight, Hayden was raised by his single mother. He originally planned on becoming a lawyer but instead opted for medical school, as he soon realized that as a lawyer he would not be able to bring about much change. In 1975, he graduated from the University of Cape Town as the top graduate in medicine, where he also received his PhD in Genetics (1979). He completed a post-doctoral fellowship and further training in Internal Medicine at Harvard Medical School. Michael is board-certified in both Internal Medicine and Clinical Genetics. He moved to Canada and joined the University of British Columbia (UBC) in 1983 from the Children's Hospital in Boston, a teaching arm of Harvard Medical School.

He is married and has four children.

Science 
Hayden's research focus is primarily on genetic diseases, including genetics of lipoprotein disorders, Huntington disease, predictive medicine, personalized medicine and drug development. Along with his research team, Hayden has identified 10 disease-causing genes, which includes the identification of the major gene underlying high-density lipoprotein (HDL) in humans. This gene, known as ABCA1, has major implications for atherosclerosis and diabetes. Hayden also identified the first mutations underlying Lipoprotein lipase deficiency (LPL)  and developed gene therapy approaches to treat this condition, the first approved gene therapy in the western world. He is also co-leader of the Canadian Pharmacogenomics Network for Drug Safety project, a BC-led Genome Canada-funded, national strategy to prevent adverse drug reactions.

Honours 
Since 2010:
 2020- David Dubinsky Humanitarian Award, American Friends of Soroka Medical Center (AFSMC)
 2017- Inductee, Canadian Medical Hall of Fame
 2015- One of 100 most inspirational and influential persons in Pharma by PharmaVoice
 2014- Honorary Doctor of Medicine, University of Göttingen
 2014- Luminary of the Year, Personalized Medicine World Conference
 
 2013-  Named one of 50 Canadians born in the 20th century who have changed the world in a book by Ken McGoogan (including Pierre Elliott Trudeau, Leonard Cohen, Oscar Peterson and John Kenneth Galbraith)
 2012- The Diamond Jubilee Medal, on behalf of HRH Queen Elizabeth II given in recognition of significant contributions and achievements.
 2011- Champion of Genetics, The Canadian Gene Cure Foundation (CGCF)
 2011- Killam Prize, Canada Council of the Arts, given in recognition of outstanding career achievements.
 2011- Aubrey J. Tingle Prize, Michael Smith Foundation for Health Research
 2011- Margolese National Prize, University of British Columbia
 2011- Canada Gairdner Wightman, Gairdner Foundation
 2011- Genome BC Award for Scientific Excellence, LifeSciences British Columbia
 2010- Order of Canada
 2010- Jacob Biely Faculty Research Prize, University of British Columbia

Art and Science 
In 2002, Hayden was part of the cast of the documentary Chasing the Cure which discussed treatments for widespread killer-heart disease, cancer, and bacterial poisoning and how research findings will change the face of medicine in the next 20 years.

Hayden appears in the 2012 documentary movie Do You Really Want to Know? directed by John Zaritsky. In the film, Hayden describes his professional relationship and friendship with Huntington's disease family member and researcher Jeff Carroll and the process of guiding Carroll and his five siblings through genetic testing for the mutation that causes Huntington's.

Hayden is also a subject in the 2013 documentary, "Alive & Well", directed by Josh Taft. In the film, he discusses his mission to find a cure for Huntington's disease.

See also

Huntington Disease
Centre for Molecular Medicine and Therapeutics
BC Children's Hospital Foundation
Tangier Disease
University of British Columbia
Personalized Medicine
Masiphumelele

References

External links

Alive & Well official homepage

Canadian geneticists
1951 births
Living people
Fellows of the Royal Society of Canada
Huntington's disease
Members of the Order of British Columbia
Members of the Order of Canada
People from Cape Town
Scientists from Vancouver
Canadian neuroscientists
Academic staff of the University of British Columbia
Jewish Canadian scientists
South African Jews
South African emigrants to Canada
Canada Research Chairs
Alumni of Herzlia High School